The 1994 Nokia Open was a women's tennis tournament played on indoor hard courts at the Beijing Comprehensive Gym in Beijing, China that was part of Tier IV of the 1994 WTA Tour. The tournament was held from 14 February through 20 February 1994. Second-seeded Yayuk Basuki won the singles title and earned $18,000 first-prize money.

Finals

Singles

 Yayuk Basuki defeated  Kyoko Nagatsuka 6–4, 6–2
 It was Basuki's 1st singles title of the year and the 5th of her career.

Doubles

 Chen Li-Ling /  Fang Li defeated  Kerry-Anne Guse /  Valda Lake 6–0, 6–2
 It was Chen's only title of the year and the 1st of her career. It was Li's only title of the year and the 2nd of her career.

External links
 ITF tournament edition details
 Tournament draws

Nokia Open
China Open (tennis)
1994 in Chinese tennis